The women's 200 metre backstroke event for the 1976 Summer Olympics was held in Montreal. The event took place on July 25, 1976.

Results

Heats
Heat 1

Heat 2

Heat 3

Heat 4

Final

References

External links
1976 Official Olympic Report

Swimming at the 1976 Summer Olympics
1976 in women's swimming
Women's events at the 1976 Summer Olympics